Rainiero d'Elci (7 March 1670 – 22 June 1761) was an Italian Cardinal.

Biography
He was born in Florence and was ordained in 1699. He entered papal service in the following year and held several offices both in Roman Curia and in the papal territorial administration. He was Inquisitor of Malta from 1711 until 1716.

He was consecrated titular archbishop of Rodi at the end of 1730. He served as apostolic nuncio in France 1731–1738. Pope Clement XII created him Cardinal on 20 December 1737 but did not publish it before the following June.  In the same year he became archbishop of Ferrara, an office he held until 1740; he was then legate in that city.

He became bishop of Sabina (10 April 1747), then bishop of Porto e Santa Rufina (9 April 1753). He became Dean of the Sacred College of Cardinals at the death of Pietro Luigi Carafa on 15 December 1755, and as such he was transferred to the see of Ostia e Velletri (proper of the Dean) on 12 January 1756.

He presided over the Papal conclave, 1758. In spite of his advanced age, he received several votes during its celebration. He died in Rome and is buried in his titular church of S. Sabina.

References

External links
Rainiero d'Elci biography

1670 births
1761 deaths
Clergy from Florence
17th-century Italian cardinals
Cardinal-bishops of Ostia
Cardinal-bishops of Porto
Cardinal-bishops of Sabina
Deans of the College of Cardinals
Rainiero
Inquisitors of Malta